The 2014 Northern Illinois Huskies football team represented Northern Illinois University as a member of the West Division of the Mid-American Conference (MAC) during the 2014 NCAA Division I FBS football season. Led by second-year head coach Rod Carey, the Huskies compiled an overall record of 11–3 with a mark of 7–1 in conference play, sharing the MAC West Division title with Toledo. By virtue of their head-to-head win over Toledo, Northern Illinois advanced to the MAC Championship Game, where they defeated Bowling Green to win the program's fifth MAC championship. The Huskies  were invited to the Boca Raton Bowl, where they lost to Conference USA champion Marshall. The team played home games at Huskie Stadium in DeKalb, Illinois.

Northern Illinois loss to Central Michigan on October 11 snapped a 26-game home winning streak dating back to the 2009 season. The season marked the Huskies' seventh consecutive trip to a bowl game and their third consecutive bowl game loss.

Schedule

References

Northern Illinois
Northern Illinois Huskies football seasons
Mid-American Conference football champion seasons
Northern Illinois Huskies football